Tian'anmenxi Station is a station on Line 1 of the Beijing Subway. It is located near Tiananmen Square, the Forbidden City, and the National Centre for the Performing Arts.

Station Layout 
The station has an underground island platform.

Exits 
There are three exits, numbered A, B, and C. Exits A and C are accessible.

References

External links
 

Beijing Subway stations in Xicheng District
Railway stations in China opened in 1999